Europa is a stream of consciousness novel by Tim Parks, first published in 1997. It was shortlisted for the Booker Prize in that year, losing out to Arundhati Roy's The God of Small Things.

Jerry Marlow is a neurotic obsessive whose first-person narration describes a coach trip he and several colleagues take to Strasbourg in order to petition the European Parliament for improved working conditions for foreign university teachers working in Italy. While observing the idiosyncrasies of his colleagues, Marlow constantly revisits personal anxieties about relationships with his ex-lover, his wife, and his daughter. In a surprising tragicomic ending, Marlow realises both success and failure, all somehow entwined and impossible to separate.

1997 novels
Novels set in France